Sultan Majid Afandiyev, also spelled Efendiyev (May 26, 1887 – April 21, 1938) was an Azerbaijani revolutionary and statesman, one of the founders of the Communist Party of Azerbaijan.

Life
Born at Shemakha in what is modern day Azerbaijan as the son of a vendor, Afandiyev participated in the revolutionary movement of Azerbaijan—at that time a region of the Russian Empire—beginning in 1902. In 1904 he became a member of the Russian Social Democratic Labour Party. Afandiyev was one of the organizers of Hummet party and took an active part in the 1905 Revolution.

Following studies at the Medicine Department of Kazan State University, Afandiyev qualified as a physician in 1915. After the February Revolution of 1917, he became a member of the Baku Council, the Hummet Committee, and the Russian Social Democratic Labour Party (Bolsheviks) Committee. During the Civil War he then took part in the defense of Astrakhan. From 1918 to 1931 Afandiyev was appointed to many roles: Commissar on the Transcaucasian Muslims' affairs of the People's Commissariat of Nationalities of RSFSR, deputy chairman of the Central Bureau of Communist Organization of Orient Peoples of the Central Committee of RKP(b) (Russian Communist Party of Bolsheviks), 1920–1921, member of the executive committee of Baku Council, Extraordinary Commissioner of the Central Committee of Azerbaijani KP(b), Commissar of Ganja Province ( he commanded the suppression of anti-Bolshevik rebellion in Ganja), member of the Central Executive Committee, People's Commissar of Lands, People's Commissar of Revolutionary Commissariat of Azerbaijan SSR, member of Central Committee of VKP(b) (All-Union Communist Party of the Bolsheviks ), member of Transcaucasian Regional Committee of VKP(b) (All-Union Communist Party of the Bolsheviks), Bureau of the Central Committee of Azerbaijani KP(b), member of the Central Executive Committee of the USSR, deputy chairman and since 1931 the chairman of the Central Executive Committee of Azerbaijani SSR and one of the chairmen of the Central Executive Committee of the Transcaucasian Soviet Federative Socialist Republic.

He also wrote for Zhizn' Natsional'nostei.

During the Great Purge, Afandiyev was arrested, accused of plotting against the Soviet state, sentenced to death and executed at Baku on April 21, 1938. In 1956 he was exonerated posthumously.

References

 Caucasian Knot : Persons : Efendiev, Sultan Medjid at eng.kavkaz.memo.ru

1887 births
1938 deaths
People from Shamakhi
Azerbaijani revolutionaries
People from Baku Governorate
Russian Social Democratic Labour Party members
Old Bolsheviks
Azerbaijani communists
Soviet Azerbaijani people
Members of the Communist Party of the Soviet Union executed by the Soviet Union
Executed politicians
Great Purge victims from Azerbaijan
Transcaucasian Socialist Federative Soviet Republic People
Soviet rehabilitations
Azerbaijani atheists